Miss Teen International 2007 took place on November 25, 2007, in Costa Rica. About 20 - 30 delegates largely from Latin America are assumed to have attended that year.

Contestants

External links
 Miss Teen International Official Site 

2007 beauty pageants